Kevin Curtis (born July 28, 1980) is an American football coach and former safety. He is currently the cornerbacks coach for the Baylor University football team.

Early years
Curtis was born in Frankfurt, Germany, but was raised in Lubbock, Texas, where he attended Coronado High School. At Coronado, he played quarterback.

Playing career

College
Curtis played safety for the Texas Tech Red Raiders from 1998-2002. He was named second-team All-American for his junior and senior seasons, and was a three time All-Big 12 selection. During the 1999 season, he was named Big 12 Defensive Player of the Week following a Red Raider victory against Colorado and was named to the Jim Thorpe Award watchlist prior to the 2000 season. He graduated in 2002 with a degree in Restaurant and Hotel Management.

Professional
Curtis was originally selected in the fourth round of the 2002 NFL Draft by the San Francisco 49ers, where he spent three seasons. He has also been a member of the Green Bay Packers, Oakland Raiders, Cologne Centurions and Houston Texans.

Coaching career

Early Coaching Career
Curtis began his coaching career in 2008 at Navarro College where he served two seasons as secondary coach. He was named cornerbacks coach at Louisiana Tech University under coach Sonny Dykes on February 22, 2010. Dykes was an assistant at Texas Tech during Curtis's college playing career. In his second season at Louisiana Tech, the secondary ranked third nationally in interceptions and pick-6s.

Texas Tech
In December 2012, Curtis accepted the same position at his alma mater Texas Tech University under former teammate and now head coach Kliff Kingsbury. In November 2015, Curtis was dismissed from Texas Tech.

Louisiana Tech
On January 15, 2016, Curtis was hired as the cornerbacks coach at Louisiana Tech.

SMU
From 2018 to 2020 he served as the cornerbacks coach on Sonny Dykes SMU staff.

Baylor
On February 21, 2021, he was hired as the corners coach at Baylor.

References

External links
Louisiana Tech Bulldogs bio
Texas Tech Red Raiders bio

1980 births
Living people
Sportspeople from Frankfurt
People from Lubbock, Texas
Coronado High School (Lubbock, Texas) alumni
American football safeties
Texas Tech Red Raiders football players
San Francisco 49ers players
Cologne Centurions (NFL Europe) players
Louisiana Tech Bulldogs football coaches
Texas Tech Red Raiders football coaches
African-American coaches of American football
21st-century African-American sportspeople
20th-century African-American people